Vinemina is a genus of moths in the family Geometridae erected by James Halliday McDunnough in 1920.

Species
Vinemina perdita Guedet, 1939
Vinemina opacaria (Hulst, 1881)
Vinemina catalina McDunnough, 1945

References

Melanolophiini